Mauladad railway station 
() is  located near Jacobabad, Sindh,  Pakistan. Mauladad Railway Station Railroad Station is located at the latitude and longitude coordinates of 28.205556 and 68.3625.

Places near station
 Maulādād (1.7 km)
 Tharari Bhaleno (2.4 km)
 Bhalenoābād (3.4 km)
 Gauhar Khān Ramdāni (4.2 km)
 Detha (4.3 km)
 Jakrāni (4.9 km)
 Ghulām Haidar Sandhān (5.2 km)
 Dādpur Jāgir (5.7 km)
 Ramzānpur (5.8 km)
 Nawāz (5.9 km)
 Ghulām Nabi Sādullah (6.1 km)
 Tharari Bhaleno (6.3 km)
 Baluch (6.8 km)
 Sharbatpur (7.3 km)
 Paki Masjid (8.1 km)
 Natkāni (8.2 km)
 Limān (8.3 km)
 Goth Ālam Khān (8.5 km)
 Chākar (8.9 km)
 Bāghi Khān Jakrāni (9 km)
 Sādiq (9 km)
 Goth Hāji Khān Domki (9.5 km)
 Moghairi (9.6 km)
 Atāi (9.7 km)
 Goth Gul Muhammad (9.9 km)
 Ghulām Muhammad (10.2 km)
 Somānpur (10.3 km)
 Goth Hāsil Khān Domki (10.4 km)
 Sobdār Khān Khosa (10.6 km)
 Goth Ghulam Muhammad (10.6 km)
 Goth Wasta (10.6 km)
 Goth Ismāīl Sarband (10.8 km)
 Goth Rais Yār Muhammad Jhakrani (10.8 km)
 Khair Wāh (11 km)

See also
 List of railway stations in Pakistan
 Pakistan Railways

References

External links

Railway stations in Jacobabad District
Railway stations on Larkana–Jacobabad line